The 2015 Cape Town Cup was a pre-season men's football friendly tournament hosted by South African Premier Division club Ajax Cape Town and held at the Cape Town Stadium, the club's home ground.

The inaugural tournament took place on 24 July and 26 July 2015 and featured the hosts, Crystal Palace, Sporting CP and Supersport United.

The winner was Sporting CP after they beat Crystal Palace in the final. There was no 4th place due to a tie in the 3rd place match.

Results

Semifinals

All kick-off times are local (UTC+02:00).

Third-place playoff

Final

References

External links
Official website

Soccer cup competitions in South Africa
2015–16 in English football
2015–16 in Portuguese football